The Coast Starlight is a passenger train operated by Amtrak on the West Coast of the United States between Seattle and Los Angeles via Portland and the San Francisco Bay Area. The train, which has operated continuously since Amtrak's formation in 1971, was the first to offer direct service between Seattle and Los Angeles. Its name is a combination of two prior Southern Pacific (SP) trains, the Coast Daylight and the Starlight.

During fiscal year (FY) 2019, the Coast Starlight carried 426,029 passengers, an increase of 2.0% from FY 2018. In FY 2016, the train had a total revenue of $40.5 million, a decrease of 1.4% from FY 2015.

History

Background

Before the formation of Amtrak, no passenger train ran the entire length of the West Coast. The closest equivalent was the Southern Pacific Railroad (SP)'s West Coast, which ran via the San Joaquin Valley from Los Angeles to Portland from 1924 to 1949, with through cars to Seattle via the Great Northern Railway (GN).

By 1971, the SP operated just two daily trains between Los Angeles and the San Francisco Bay Area: the Los Angeles–San Francisco Coast Daylight via the Coast Line, and the Los Angeles–Oakland San Joaquin Daylight via the Central Valley. The SP also operated the tri-weekly Cascade between Oakland and Portland, Oregon. The Burlington Northern Railroad (BN) and Union Pacific Railroad ran three daily round trips between Portland and Seattle. The Santa Fe ran the San Diegan between Los Angeles and San Diego.

Amtrak era

The Seattle–San Diego route was initially left out of plans for Railpax (later Amtrak) until protests from politicians in California, Oregon, and Washington. With the start of Amtrak operations on May 1, 1971, a single train began running between Seattle and San Diego. The unnamed train (#11/12) ran three days a week; on the other four days, another unnamed train (#98/99) ran between Oakland and Los Angeles. On November 14, Amtrak extended the Oakland–Los Angeles train to San Diego, renumbered it to #12/13, and renamed it Coast Daylight. The Seattle–San Diego train became the Coast Daylight/Starlight (#11-12) northbound and Coast Starlight/Daylight (#13-14) southbound. Both trains were cut back from San Diego to Los Angeles in April 1972, replaced by a third San Diegan. On June 10, 1973, Amtrak began running the combined Coast Daylight/Starlight daily for the summer months. Positive response led to Amtrak to retain this service, and the Coast Daylight name was dropped on May 19, 1974.

An additional train, the Spirit of California, ran the section of the route between Sacramento and Los Angeles on an overnight schedule from October 25, 1981, to September 30, 1983. From November 10, 1996, to October 25, 1997, through coaches were transferred between the Coast Starlight and San Diegan at Los Angeles.

The Coast Starlight originally used the Southern Pacific West Valley Line between Tehama and Davis. That route included a stop at Orland, but bypassed Sacramento. On April 26, 1982, the train was rerouted via Roseville on the Southern Pacific Valley and Martinez Subdivisions, with stops added at Sacramento, Chico, and Marysville, per request from the state. In 1999, the Coast Starlight was rerouted onto the more direct ex-Western Pacific Sacramento Subdivision between Marysville and Sacramento, with the Marysville stop closed.

Ridership declined by 26% between 1999 and 2005 as freight congestion and track maintenance on the Union Pacific Railroad reduced the Coast Starlights on-time performance to 2%, which Amtrak characterized as "dismal." By mid-summer in 2006 delays of 5–11 hours were common. Critics dubbed the train the Star-late. During early summer 2008, the Coast Starlight was relaunched with new amenities and refurbished equipment. In July 2008, refurbished Pacific Parlour cars returned to service as part of the relaunch. This was much anticipated, due to the success of Amtrak's relaunch of the Empire Builder. Between FY 2008 and FY 2009, ridership on the Coast Starlight jumped 15% from 353,657 passengers to 406,398 passengers. Operating conditions on the UP improved as well; by May 2008 on-time performance had reached 86%.

Service was suspended north of Sacramento for a month in 2017 after a freight derailment damaged a bridge near Mount Shasta, California.

On February 24, 2019, the southbound Coast Starlight struck a fallen tree near Oakridge, Oregon after a rare heavy snowstorm. The train was stranded for 36 hours before tracks could be cleared for a Union Pacific locomotive to tow the train back to Eugene–Springfield.

From October 1, 2020, to May 24, 2021, daily service was reduced to three trains per week due to the COVID-19 pandemic. On May 24, 2021, as part of its post-COVID service restorations, Amtrak restored the Coast Starlight frequency to daily service in both directions.

In late June 2021, the Lava Fire seriously damaged a Union Pacific trestle on the Black Butte Subdivision between Klamath Falls, Oregon and Dunsmuir, California. As a result, the Coast Starlight was initially split into two segments: Seattle to Klamath Falls and Sacramento to Los Angeles with a bus replacement service filling the gap between Klamath Falls and Sacramento. However, on July 2, 2021, it was announced that service would be discontinued between Seattle and Sacramento until July 14, 2021, with Amtrak Cascades replacing service for passengers booked between Seattle and Eugene. Through service resumed on July 15 using overnight buses between Sacramento and Klamath Falls, and full-route train operation resumed on August 23.

A resurgence of the COVID-19 virus caused by the Omicron variant caused Amtrak to reduce the frequency of this route to five-weekly round trips from January to March 2022.

Trains began running over the Point Defiance Bypass between Tacoma and DuPont, Washington starting on November 18, 2021.

Future improvements

The 2018 California State Rail Plan, prepared by Caltrans, outlines a number of planned improvements to rail infrastructure in the state of California. These proposals include near-term plans to create additional stops on the Coast Subdivision at Soledad and King City for use by the Coast Starlight. There is also a proposal in the Capitol Corridor Vision plan to improve the right-of-way shared by the Capitol Corridor and Coast Starlight between Oakland and Martinez. The proposal would re-route the train from along the coastline to a new tunnel through Franklin Canyon and a right-of-way next to California State Route 4 that would reduce the trip time by several minutes.

Route 

Except for two sections, most of the Coast Starlight route is on former Southern Pacific lines now owned by the Union Pacific Railroad. The Coast Starlight runs over the following lines:
BNSF Seattle Subdivision (ex-NP, later ex-BN): Seattle to Tacoma, Washington
Sound Transit (SDRX) Point Defiance Bypass: Tacoma to DuPont, Washington
BNSF Seattle Subdivision: DuPont to Portland, Oregon
UP Brooklyn Subdivision: Portland to Eugene, Oregon
UP Cascade Subdivision: Eugene to Klamath Falls, Oregon
UP Black Butte Subdivision: Klamath Falls to Dunsmuir, California
UP Valley Subdivision: Dunsmuir to Marysville, California
UP Sacramento Subdivision (ex-WP): Marysville to Sacramento, California
UP Martinez Subdivision: Sacramento to Oakland
UP Niles Subdivision: Oakland to Elmhurst
UP Coast Subdivision: Elmhurst to San Luis Obispo
UP Santa Barbara Subdivision: San Luis Obispo to Moorpark, California
Metrolink (SCAX) Ventura Subdivision: Moorpark to Taylor Yard, Los Angeles
Metrolink (SCAX) River Subdivision: Taylor Yard to Los Angeles Union Station

The Coast Starlight is occasionally diverted between Oakland and Los Angeles via the Central Valley and Tehachapi Pass due to track work or service disruptions on the Coast Line. These rerouted trains are popular with railfans because they use the Tehachapi Loop, which passenger trains have otherwise been rerouted from since 1971.

Ridership

Equipment 
The train uses double-decker Superliner I & II equipment, including a Sightseer Lounge car that has floor-to-ceiling windows to view the passing scenery. Baggage is placed in one of Amtrak's new Viewliner II single-level baggage cars or in designated coach-class cars. The Coast Starlight typically uses two GE P42DCs for locomotive power. Secondary locomotives that are occasionally utilized are the older GE P32-8BWHs and GE P40DCs. While the length of the train varies, in 2011 the "peak" consist comprised a baggage car, Transition sleeper, three sleeping cars, Pacific Parlour Car, dining car, Sightseer Lounge, and four coaches. , Siemens ALC-42 locomotives are expected to enter service on the Coast Starlight in 2023.

Prior to February 2018, the Coast Starlight was unique in that it included a first-class lounge car called the "Pacific Parlour Car". The cars were Budd Hi-Level Sky Lounge cars, built in 1956 for the Santa Fe's El Capitan service. Called a "living room on rails", the Parlour car offered several amenities to first-class sleeping car passengers including wireless Internet access, a full bar, a small library with books and games, an afternoon wine tasting, and a movie theater on the lower level. Sleeping car passengers could also make reservations to dine in the Parlour car, which offered a unique menu not offered in the standard dining car. In February 2018, in a cost-cutting measure, Amtrak discontinued the Pacific Parlour Cars, citing the move as "part of Amtrak's ongoing work to modernize its fleet of equipment."

References

Notes

Further reading

External links

Amtrak routes
Passenger rail transportation in California
Passenger rail transportation in Oregon
Passenger rail transportation in Washington (state)
Public transportation in Southern California
Night trains of the United States
Railway services introduced in 1971
Long distance Amtrak routes